The men's discus throw event at the 2005 Summer Universiade was held on 16–17 August in Izmir, Turkey.

Medalists

Results

Qualification

Final

References
Finals results
Full results

Athletics at the 2005 Summer Universiade
2005